William Jacob Aldag (30 November 1905 – 10 November 1974) was an Australian rules footballer who played for Footscray and Collingwood in the Victorian Football League (VFL).

Aldag had his first league season in 1928 with Footscray. In 1930, he joined Collingwood and was a half-forward flanker in their record-setting 1930 premiership team.

Aldag enlisted in the 2nd AIF in 1940 and served in the Middle East in 1941 before being posted to Java, where he was declared missing in 1942. Aldag was later found in a POW camp in Thailand, where he worked on the infamous Burma Railway in appalling conditions. He returned home in November 1945.

References

External links

Holmesby, Russell and Main, Jim (2007). The Encyclopedia of AFL Footballers. 7th ed. Melbourne: Bas Publishing.

1905 births
Western Bulldogs players
Collingwood Football Club players
Collingwood Football Club Premiership players
Australian rules footballers from Melbourne
Australian Army personnel of World War II
Burma Railway prisoners
1974 deaths
Australian prisoners of war
Australian Army soldiers
One-time VFL/AFL Premiership players
Missing in action of World War II
People from Fitzroy, Victoria
Military personnel from Melbourne